Triptykon is a Swiss extreme metal band from Zürich, formed in 2008 by Thomas Gabriel Fischer, founding member of the pioneering heavy metal bands Hellhammer, Celtic Frost and Apollyon Sun.

History
Fischer announced his departure from Celtic Frost in May 2008 and shortly afterwards revealed his new project would be entitled Triptykon.
The name of the band is the Greek word for "triptych", and is aimed at stating that Triptykon is founding member Thomas Gabriel Fischer's third project after Hellhammer and Celtic Frost. The band logo is inspired by a writing pattern used during the time of the Weimar Republic.

On 5 August 2009, Triptykon issued a press release indicating the recording of their debut album, Eparistera Daimones, would commence in the middle of August and continue through November, with a release in the spring of 2010.

On 21 December 2009, Triptykon issued a new press release to reveal Prowling Death Records Ltd. entered into a licensing agreement with Century Media Records to release Eparistera Daimones on 22 March 2010.

A follow-up EP, entitled Shatter, was released on 25 October 2010. A music video for the song Shatter has also been released.

It was announced on 22 October 2013 that the new album will be titled Melana Chasmata.

On 7 February 2014, Melana Chasmatas release date was revealed as being on 14 April 2014. The new album was received by music critics with a widely excellent critical response.

In early August 2017, Triptykon announced that drummer Norman Lonhard would be exiting the band, and that auditions for a replacement would soon be underway. Lonhard's final performance with the band was at the Party.San Open Air festival in Schlotheim, Germany on 12 August.

A new album Requiem (Live at Roadburn 2019) was released in May 2020. Metal Hammer named it the 47th best metal album of 2020.

Members 

Current
 Thomas Gabriel Fischer – lead vocals, rhythm guitar, programming (2008–present)
 Victor "V. Santura" Bullok – lead guitar, backing vocals, additional co-lead vocals (2008–present)
 Vanja Slajh – bass, backing vocals (2008–present)
 Hannes Grossmann – drums, percussion (2018–present)

Former

 Reed St. Mark – drums, percussion (2008)
 Norman Lonhard – drums, percussion (2008–2017)

Timeline

Discography

Studio albums

EPs

Live albums

Singles

References

External links

 Official website
 

Avant-garde metal musical groups
Musical groups established in 2008
Swiss heavy metal musical groups
Century Media Records artists
Musical quartets